"If a Song Could Get Me You" is a single by Norwegian singer-songwriter Marit Larsen. It is Larsen's first international single and reached  1 in Norway, Austria, and Germany.

Lyrical content
The song deals with a broken relationship. The singer would do everything and try every song to get her boyfriend back.

Chart performance
In Norway, the single entered the chart at No. 1 and stayed there for two consecutive weeks. In Germany it entered at No. 15, rose to No. 3 the next week and in the third week it was No. 1. It stayed there for five consecutive weeks. The song charted at No. 32 in its first week in Austria and in the fourth week, it became No. 1. After one week, it was beaten by "I Gotta Feeling" by the Black Eyed Peas. It then returned to its peak position and held it for three more weeks. In Switzerland, it held the No. 2 spot for one week, beaten by "I Gotta Feeling".

Charts

Weekly charts

Year-end charts

Decade-end charts

Certifications

References

2008 singles
2008 songs
2009 singles
Columbia Records singles
Marit Larsen songs
Number-one singles in Austria
Number-one singles in Germany
Number-one singles in Norway
Songs written by Marit Larsen